The 35th Artistic Gymnastics World Championships were held in Ghent, Belgium, in 2001 at the Flanders Sports Arena. This was the first Worlds at which the 6-3-3—six athletes per team, three compete, all three scores count—format was used in team finals. 2001 Worlds was also the last World Championships in which three gymnasts per country were permitted to advance to the all-around finals.

Results

Medal table

Overall

Men

Women

Men

Team Final

All-around

Floor Exercise

Pommel Horse

Rings

Vault

Parallel Bars

Horizontal Bar

Women

Team Final

All Around Final

Vault Final

Uneven Bars Final

Balance Beam Final

Floor Exercise Final

References

 FIG Official Results: 35th World Artistic Gymnastics Championships.

World Artistic Gymnastics Championships
G
G
W